This is a list of German television related events from 2011.

Events
7 May - Pietro Lombardi wins the eighth season of Deutschland sucht den Superstar.
14 May - The 56th Eurovision Song Contest is held at the Esprit Arena in Düsseldorf. Azerbaijan wins the contest with the song "Running Sacred", performed by Eli & Nikki.
18 May - The Kelly Family singer Maite Kelly and her partner Christian Polanc win the fourth season of Let's Dance.
8 June - TV chef Horst Lichter and his wife Nada become the first contestants to win €1million on Rette die Million!.
12 September - Marc Sonnen wins the eleventh season of Big Brother Germany.
6 December - David Pfeffer wins the second season of X Factor.
17 December - 27-year-old panpipe player Leo Rojas wins the fifth season of Das Supertalent.

Debuts

Free for air

Domestic
24 November - The Voice of Germany (2011–present)

International
4 March -  United States of Tara (2009–2011) (Das Erste)
23 April -  The Jungle Book (2010–2015) (ZDF)

Cable

International
18 September - // The Amazing World of Gumball (2011–2019) (Cartoon Network)
19 September - / My Little Pony: Friendship is Magic (2010–2019) (Nickelodeon)
8 November - / The Octonauts (2010–present) (Disney Junior)

Military Television

Military Television Debuts

BFBS
 Everything's Rosie (2010–2015)
/ Mrs Brown's Boys (2011–present)
 Driver Dan's Story Train (2010–2013)
 Sooty (2011–present)

Television shows

1950s
Tagesschau (1952–present)

1960s
 heute (1963-present)

1970s
 heute-journal (1978-present)
 Tagesthemen (1978-present)

1980s
Wetten, dass..? (1981-2014)
Lindenstraße (1985–present)

1990s
Gute Zeiten, schlechte Zeiten (1992–present)
Marienhof (1992–2011)
Unter uns (1994-present)
Verbotene Liebe (1995-2015)
Schloss Einstein (1998–present)
In aller Freundschaft (1998–present)
Wer wird Millionär? (1999-present)

2000s
Deutschland sucht den Superstar (2002–present)
Let's Dance (2006–present)
Das Supertalent (2007–present)

2010s
X Factor (2010-2012)

Ending this year
Big Brother Germany (2000-2011, 2015–present)
Marienhof (1992–2011)

Births

Deaths

See also
2011 in Germany